The 1980 U.S. National Indoor Championships was a men's tennis tournament played on indoor carpet courts at the Racquet Club of Memphis in Memphis, Tennessee in the United States. The event was part of the Grand Prix circuit. It was the 11th edition of the tournament in the open era and was held from February 25 through March 3, 1980. First-seeded John McEnroe won the singles title and $40,000 first-prize money. As a result of his title win McEnroe overtook Björn Borg as the ATP world No. 1 ranked player.

Finals

Singles
 John McEnroe defeated  Jimmy Connors 7–6(8–6), 7–6(7–4)
 It was McEnroe's 2nd singles title of the year and the 17th of his career.

Doubles
 John McEnroe /  Brian Gottfried defeated  Rod Frawley /  Tomáš Šmíd 6–3, 6–7, 7–6

See also
 Connors–McEnroe rivalry

References

External links
 ATP tournament profile
 ITF tournament details

U.S. National Indoor Tennis Championships
U.S. National Indoor Championships
U.S. National Indoor Tennis Championships
U.S. National Indoor Tennis Championships
U.S. National Indoor Tennis Championships
U.S. National Indoor Tennis Championships